Lani Brockman (born December 11, 1956 in Seattle) is an American theater actress and  director. She is the founder and Artistic Director of Studio East.

Brockman was born in Seattle and grew up in Hawaii. After working as an actress, and later as director of youth programs for Northwest Actors Studio, she founded Studio East in Kirkland, Washington in 1992.

In partnership with Susan Bardsley, Brockman formed Dementia Unlimited to write original musical adaptations for young audiences. Titles include "3 Little Pigs", "Snow White", "Sleeping Beauty", "The Ugly Duckling", "Jack and the Beanstalk", "Little Red Riding Hood", "Hansel and Gretel", "Goldilocks and the 3 Bears", "Rumplestiltskin", "Cinderella", "The Emperor's New Clothes", and "Frog Prince". All these shows have been performed by StoryBook Theater.

Brockman and Bardsley also wrote the original musical "'Twas the Night" which has been performed since 2001 as an annual holiday show at Studio East.

References

External links
 Studio East
 Dementia Unlimited
 Northwest Actors Studio

American stage actresses
American theatre directors
Women theatre directors
Circle in the Square Theatre School alumni
1956 births
Living people
21st-century American women